The 1986 Cronulla-Sutherland Sharks season was the 20th in the club's history. They competed in the NSWRL's 1986 Winfield Cup premiership as well as the 1986 National Panasonic Cup.

Ladder

References

Cronulla-Sutherland Sharks seasons
Cronulla-Sutherland Sharks season
Cronulla-Sutherland Sharks season